Christiana vescoana is a species of plant in the family Malvaceae. It is endemic to French Polynesia.

References

Brownlowioideae
Flora of French Polynesia
Data deficient plants
Taxonomy articles created by Polbot
Taxa named by Henri Ernest Baillon
Taxa named by Klaus Kubitzki
Taxobox binomials not recognized by IUCN